Maria Hines is a Seattle restaurateur and James Beard Award-winning chef. She's also the co-author of the cook book Peak Nutrition: Smart Fuel for Outdoor Adventure.

Early life and career
Hines was raised in Bowling Green, Ohio and San Diego, California, and she earned a degree in culinary arts from Mesa College. She worked in kitchens across the country and in Europe before becoming executive chef at Earth & Ocean in the W Hotel in Seattle.

Restaurants
In 2005, she was named one of the “Top Ten Best New Chefs in America” by Food & Wine magazine, and she decided to open her own restaurant. The restaurant was named Tilth, and it opened in Wallingford in 2006. Hines worked with Nora Pouillon and Oregon Tilth to have the restaurant certified organic. In 2008, the New York Times recognized Tilth as one of the ten best new restaurants in the country. In 2009, Hines won the James Beard Award for Best Chef: Northwest.

Hines opened two more restaurants: the Golden Beetle in 2011, and Agrodolce in 2012, both certified organic. The Golden Beetle was not financially successful and closed in 2016. In March 2019, Hines announced that she would sell Agrodolce to her executive chef, focusing her efforts on Tilth and on writing a cookbook and developing retail products.

Tilth closed in October 2020 due to the COVID pandemic.

Television
In 2010, Hines won an episode of Iron Chef America, defeating Masaharu Morimoto in a battle of Pacific cod She also competed on an episode of Top Chef Masters, and she appeared on Martha with Martha Stewart.

Activism
Hines was a founder of Seattle restaurant week and is known as a pioneer of organic and Pacific Northwest cuisine. She was a notable proponent of Washington Initiative 522 which would have required labeling of genetically modified food.

References

External links

Living people
People from San Diego
Businesspeople from Seattle
American women restaurateurs
American restaurateurs
Chefs from Seattle
American women chefs
James Beard Foundation Award winners
Year of birth missing (living people)
21st-century American women